Scrobipalpa laisinca is a moth in the family Gelechiidae. It was described by Povolný in 1976. It is found in southern Iran.

The length of the forewings . The forewings are brownish with contrasting marks. There are three black stigmata and marginal dots. The hindwings are whitish with darker margins.

References

Scrobipalpa
Moths described in 1976